Fayez Al-Olayani (born 25 August 1984) is a Saudi football player. He currently plays as a midfielder.

Honours
Al-Fateh SC
Saudi Professional League: 2012–13
Saudi Super Cup: 2013

References

1984 births
Living people
Saudi Arabian footballers
Abha Club players
Al-Fateh SC players
Damac FC players
Jerash FC players
Saudi First Division League players
Saudi Professional League players
Saudi Fourth Division players
Association football midfielders